The Indian Premier League is a Twenty20 (T20) competition in men's cricket. Organised by the Board of Control for Cricket in India (BCCI), the tournament has taken place every year since it was first held in 2008. Several teams went in and out of the tournament at different years, while the names of some teams were changed. The tournament format has always been a round-robin format, where each team plays with each other team twice, each match in either of the team's homeground.

Indian batsman Virat Kohli holds the record for the most runs made in the IPL, since its beginning in 2008. Chris Gayle, however, holds many of the individual scoring records including, highest-individual score in a match (175 runs off 66 balls), most centuries (6), the most 6s scored (326) most 6s in a match (17), fastest century (from 30 balls).AB de Villiers holds the record for Player of the match award (24).

Dwayne Bravo holds the record for the most wickets taken (172).

MS Dhoni, Dinesh Karthik and Robin Uthappa dominate the Wicket-keeping records, all 3 being among the top 5 players of most stumps and most catches. The most overall catches by any fielder is 102 catches by the batsman Suresh Raina.

RCB has scored the highest runs in a match with an astounding score of 263–5 against PWI in 2013, the same match in which Gayle hit his record score for a match in IPL, and also the record for the highest number of 6's in an innings. This is also the second highest innings total by any team in a T20 match. The second record is also set by RCB against GL, having scored 248–5. CSK set the record 246–5 against RR. Royals chased a target of 224 in 2020, which is the highest successful run chase in the league history.

Only 5 teams have won a title since the beginning of the league. MI, has won the highest number of tournaments i.e. 5 with CSK, who holds the current champion title,  winning 4 titles and KKR winning 2.

Listing criteria 
In general the top five are listed in each category (except when there is a tie for the last place among the five, when all the tied record holders are noted).

Listing notation 
Team notation
 (200–3) indicates that a team scored 200 runs for three wickets and the innings was closed, either due to a successful run chase or if no playing time remained
 (200) indicates that a team scored 200 runs and was all out

Batting notation
 (100) indicates that a batsman scored 100 runs and was out
 (100*) indicates that a batsman scored 100 runs and was not out

Bowling notation
 (5–20) indicates that a bowler has captured 5 wickets while conceding 20 runs

Currently playing
  indicates a current cricketer

Start Date
 indicates the date the match starts

Team records

Team Performance

By Season
Out of the thirteen teams that have played in the Indian Premier League since its inception, one team has won the competition five times, one team has won the competition three times, one team has won the competition twice and three other teams have won it once. MI are the most successful team in the league's history with five IPL titles to their name. CSK have won the title thrice, and are the only team to have reached the playoff stage of the competition every year they have played except for 2020 and 2022. The KKR have won two titles, and the other three teams who have won the tournament are the Deccan Chargers, RR and SRH. 
The current champions are MI who beat DC in the final of the 2020 season to secure their fifth title.

†No longer exists.

Team wins, losses and draws

Playing teams

Defunct teams

Result records

Greatest win margin (by runs)

Greatest win margin (by balls remaining)

Greatest win margins (by 10 wickets)

Narrowest win margin (by 1 run)

Win off the last ball

Narrowest win margins (by wickets)

Highest successful chases

Lowest successful defence

Tied Matches

Team scoring records

Highest Totals

Lowest Totals

Highest match aggregate

Lowest match aggregate

Individual Records (Batting)

Most runs

Most runs in each batting position

Most runs against each team

Most runs for each team

Highest individual score

Highest individual score against each team

Highest career average

Most half-centuries

Most 50+ Scores

Fastest Fifties

Most centuries

Fastest Centuries

Fastest to multiples of 1000 runs

Most Sixes

Most sixes in an innings

Most Fours

Most fours in an innings

Highest strike rates

Highest strike rates in an innings

Most runs in a series

Most runs in an over

Most ducks

Individual Records (Bowling)

Most career wickets

Most wickets against each team

Most wickets for each team

Best figures in an innings

Best figures in an innings against each team

Best career average

Best career economy rate

Best career strike rate

Most maidens

Most dot balls

Fastest to multiples of 50 wickets

Most four-wickets (& over) hauls in an innings

Best economy rates in an innings

Best strike rates in an innings

Most runs conceded in a match

Most wickets in a season

Hat-tricks

Individual Records (Wicket-keeping)

Most career dismissals

Most career catches

Most career stumpings

Most dismissals in an innings

Most dismissals in a series

Individual Records (Fielding)

Most career catches

Most catches in an innings

Most catches in a series

Individual Records (All-Rounder)

500 Runs and 20 wickets Overall

200 Runs and 5 wickets in a season

Individual Records (Other)

Most matches

Most matches as captain

Most matches won as a captain

Most runs as captain

Most man of the match awards

Miscellaneous records

Partnership Record

Highest partnerships by wicket

Highest partnerships by runs

Umpiring Records

Awards

Orange Cap

The Orange Cap is awarded to the top run-scorer in the IPL during a season. It is an ongoing competition with the leader wearing the cap throughout the tournament until the final game, with the eventual winner keeping the cap for the season.

Purple Cap

The Purple Cap is awarded to the top wicket-taker in the IPL during a season. It is an ongoing competition with the leader wearing the cap throughout the tournament until the final game, with the eventual winner keeping the cap for the season.

See also 
 List of Chennai Super Kings records
 List of Delhi Capitals records
 List of Kolkata Knight Riders records
 List of Mumbai Indians records
 List of Punjab Kings records
 List of Rajasthan Royals records
 List of Royal Challengers Bangalore records
 List of Sunrisers Hyderabad records

References

External links 
IPL stats at IPLT20
Indian Premier League records at ESPN Cricinfo

Stats
Lists of Indian cricket records and statistics
Indian Premier League lists